Lara Bianconi (born 9 May 1974) is an Italian backstroke and medley swimmer. She competed in two events at the 1992 Summer Olympics.

References

1974 births
Living people
Italian female backstroke swimmers
Italian female medley swimmers
Olympic swimmers of Italy
Swimmers at the 1992 Summer Olympics
Place of birth missing (living people)